Syed Sir Ross Masood bin Mahmood Khan (15 February 1889 – 30 July 1937), was the Vice-Chancellor of Aligarh Muslim University starting in 1929.

Early life and career
Ross Masood was the son of Syed Mahmood. His grandfather was Sir Syed Ahmed Khan. He had three children: one daughter, Nadira Begum, and two sons, Anwar Masood and Akbar Masood (1917–1971). Ross Masood was educated at Aligarh Muslim University and the University of Oxford.

On his return from England, Masood was elected a trustee of Muhammadan Anglo-Oriental College and started his own legal practice in Patna. He then entered the Indian Education Service as headmaster of the Patna High School, a professor of history at Ravenshaw College, Cuttack (Orissa), and one of the founders of Osmania University.

From 1916 to 1928, he was Director of Public Instruction in Hyderabad Deccan. In 1922, he travelled to Japan to assess its educational system as a possible model for Hyderabad. In his publication, Japan and its Educational System (1923), Masood recommended that Hyderabad follow a Japanese model of modernization and educational reform by focusing on the imperial tradition, patriotic nationalism, and freedom from foreign control.

He became the Vice-Chancellor of Aligarh Muslim University in 1929. He was knighted by the British Government in the 1933 Birthday Honours list. Here, he introduced new courses, upgraded the syllabi and established laboratories for various science subjects.

Anjuman Taraqqi-i-Urdu published a biography of Masood in 2011. He was the president of Anjuman Taraqqi-i-Urdu.

A residential hall constructed in the year 1969 in Aligarh Muslim University is named after him.

Ross Masood was linked to the British novelist E. M. Forster. Forster's novel A Passage to India (1924) is dedicated to Masood.

References

External links

1889 births
1937 deaths
Knights Bachelor
Indian Knights Bachelor
Aligarh Muslim University alumni
Indian Education Service officers
Vice-Chancellors of the Aligarh Muslim University
Indian Muslims
20th-century Indian educational theorists
Scholars from Uttar Pradesh